The Boston Blazers were an indoor lacrosse team in the National Lacrosse League (NLL). The Blazers were based in Boston, Massachusetts, and began play in the 2009 NLL season.

The team was owned by Tim Armstrong, the former President of Advertising and Commerce for Google. who is currently CEO of AOL. NLL veteran Tom Ryan was the team's head coach until being dismissed on December 23, 2010. Ryan was replaced on December 28, 2010 by former Toronto Rock assistant coach Matt Sawyer. On April 7, 2008, the Blazers named veteran New England marketing executive Doug Reffue to the position of team president.

The team was not associated with the former Boston Blazers, who played in the MILL (predecessor to the NLL) from 1992 to 1997. However, the name was chosen "in part due to the popularity and nostalgia associated with the former Boston Blazers franchise".

On August 30, 2011, the team announced that it would be temporarily suspend operations for the 2012 season as they sought a new home facility for the 2013 season. However the team has yet to resume operations by 2023.

History
The Blazers were originally scheduled to begin play in the 2008 NLL season. On July 31, 2007 the league held an expansion draft and the Blazers selected a number of players. In preparation for the season, the team also made a number of trades. On October 16, 2007, the NLL announced that the 2008 season had been cancelled due to the failure of the league and the Professional Lacrosse Players' Association to reach a new collective bargaining agreement. However, the negotiations continued, and on October 25, the league announced that a new seven-year agreement had been reached, and that the season would be played. A new schedule was announced on November 2, 2007, but only included 12 of the expected 14 teams; the Blazers and the Arizona Sting had been removed. The reasons that the Blazers and Sting opted out of the season were not given, just that it was "due to a number of business issues", and that both teams would return in 2009. A dispersal draft was held on November 5, 2007.

Inaugural season
The 2009 NLL season was the Boston Blazers' first season playing in the league. In order to field a team for the season, the Blazers participated in the three separate drafts: the Arizona Sting dispersal draft, the expansion draft on July 24, and the entry draft in September.

On June 30, in the Arizona Sting dispersal draft, the Blazers selected Dan Dawson first overall and forward Peter Veltman with the first pick of the second round. On July 24 the team picked 12 additional players for their roster in the 2008 expansion draft, including goaltender Mike Poulin with the first overall selection.

Shortly after the draft concluded, the Blazers traded Cam Bergman back to the Edmonton Rush for F Brenden Thenhaus and G Kurtis Wagar.

On July 29, the Blazers and Rochester Knighthawks swapped defenders, with Kyle Laverty going to Rochester in exchange for University of Massachusetts Amherst alum Jack Reid.

On July 30, the Blazers, San Jose Stealth, and Calgary Roughnecks completed a 3-way trade that sent Tom Johnson, Travis Gillespie, and Boston's 3rd-round pick in the 2009 NLL Entry Draft to San Jose, Devan Wray to Calgary, and forward Sean Morris (another UMass alum and Marshfield, MA native), defenseman Steve Panarelli, Calgary's 3rd-round pick in the 2009 NLL Entry Draft, and San Jose's 2nd-round pick in the 2010 NLL Entry Draft to Boston.

Only weeks before the season began, the Chicago Shamrox suspended operations, and another dispersal draft was held. The Blazers had the first overall pick, and chose former Goaltender of the Year Anthony Cosmo.

Final roster

All time Record

Playoff Results

National Lacrosse League
Box lacrosse
Lacrosse
Boston Blazers (1992-1997)
New England Blazers
Boston Cannons

Awards and honors

Draft history

NLL Entry Draft 
First Round Selections

 2007: Craig Point (3rd overall), Matt Lyons (11th overall) 
 2008: Daryl Veltman (1st overall) 
 2009: Max Seibald (8th overall)
 2010: Kyle Rubisch (2nd overall), David Brock (7th overall)
 2011: None

External links
NLL Official Website
Team Announcement Press Release at NLL.com

References

Defunct National Lacrosse League teams
Lacrosse teams in Boston
Lacrosse clubs established in 2007
Sports clubs disestablished in 2012
2007 establishments in Massachusetts
2012 disestablishments in Massachusetts